Markus Egger (born 24 February 1975 in Zug) is a retired professional male beach volleyball player from Switzerland. Partnering Sascha Heyer he claimed the gold medal at the 2001 European Championships in Jesolo, Italy.

Playing partners
 Sascha Heyer
 Bernhard Vesti
 Martin Laciga

References
 Markus Egger at the Beach Volleyball Database

1975 births
Living people
Swiss beach volleyball players
Men's beach volleyball players
People from Zug
Sportspeople from the canton of Zug